Protocol III is a 2005 amendment protocol to the Geneva Conventions relating to the Adoption of an Additional Distinctive Emblem. Under the protocol, the protective sign of the Red Crystal may be displayed by medical and religious personnel at times of war, instead of the traditional Red Cross or Red Crescent symbols. People displaying any of these protective emblems are performing a humanitarian service and must be protected by all parties to the conflict.

History 

By the middle of the 19th century, modern warfare had become increasingly indiscriminate. It was not uncommon for a combat medic on the field of battle to be fired upon and to die while collecting and caring for the wounded. There was a growing recognition of the need to distinguish medical personnel from combatants, to make it easier for military commanders to avoid and protect them. Allowing each country to develop its own emblem would have led to confusion. What was needed to save lives was a single neutral emblem that all countries recognized and used equally.

The 1864 Geneva Convention establishes that a distinctive emblem should be worn by medical personnel on the field of battle as an indication of their humanitarian mission and their non-combatant status. At that time, the chosen symbol was a red cross on a white background. Muslim nations have objected to this symbol due to its resemblance to the Christian cross. As early as 1876, the Ottoman Empire introduced the Red Crescent as an alternative, less Christian emblem. Additional emblems have been proposed, including the red lion and sun of Persia, the double emblem (both the red cross and red crescent together) by the Red Cross Society of Eritrea, and the red shield of David by Magen David Adom of Israel.

Over time the adoption of a single, universal emblem has been met with two recurrent difficulties:

 They may be perceived as having religious, cultural or political connotations. This perception conflicts with neutral, humanitarian status of medical personnel in armed conflicts.
  These emblems are tied to membership in the National Societies. Members are required to use the red cross or red crescent emblem. Since Magen David Adom was unwilling to give up their red shield of David, they were not granted membership. Without membership, they were not eligible for certain protections under the Geneva Conventions.

In 2005, an international delegation finally achieved a comprehensive solution to these difficulties with the adoption of Protocol III. Magen David Adom is granted protections under the Geneva Conventions as long as they display the Red Crystal in the context of international conflict. As of July 2020, Protocol III has been ratified or acceded to by 78 countries and signed by a further 20. The treaty came into force on 14 January 2007.

Governing rules 

Article 2 of this brief protocol recognizes an additional distinctive emblem, the Red Crystal, that may be used in addition to, and for the same purposes as, the Red Cross and Red Crescent symbols. All three emblems are appointed the same legal status.

There are two distinct uses that are recognized for all three emblems:

 Protective use. Medical and religious personnel may mark themselves, their vehicles, ships and buildings as a sign of their humanitarian mission and protected status under the Geneva Conventions, particularly the First Geneva Convention. The protections of the Geneva Convention do not depend on the wearing of the emblem. The emblems are merely a visible sign of the protected status of individuals. Members of the armed forces may use these markings at all times. Civilian institutions such as hospitals may use these markings temporarily, within the context of an armed conflict.
 Indicative use. Members of the movement may wear the emblems in both times of conflict and times of peace as an indication of their membership.

Misuse of these emblems is prohibited by international law. Misuse may diminish their protective value and undermine the effectiveness of humanitarian workers. Use of one of the emblems to protect combatants and military equipment with the intent of misleading an adversary is perfidy and is considered a war crime.

See also
List of parties to the Geneva Conventions: includes a list of states that signed and a list of states that have ratified Protocol III
 Protocol I, a 1977 amendment adopted addressing the protection of victims in international conflicts.
 Protocol II,  a 1977 amendment adopted relating to the protection of victims of non-international armed conflicts.

References

External links 
Committee of the Red Cross: Full text of Protocol III with commentaries
List of countries that have ratified Protocol III
List of countries that have signed but not yet ratified Protocol III
Press release from the International Committee of the Red Cross welcoming the signing of Protocol III

Geneva Conventions
Treaties concluded in 2005
Treaties entered into force in 2007
Treaties of Albania
Treaties of Argentina
Treaties of Armenia
Treaties of Australia
Treaties of Austria
Treaties of Belarus
Treaties of Belize
Treaties of Brazil
Treaties of Bulgaria
Treaties of Canada
Treaties of Chile
Treaties of the Cook Islands
Treaties of Costa Rica
Treaties of Croatia
Treaties of Cyprus
Treaties of the Czech Republic
Treaties of Denmark
Treaties of the Dominican Republic
Treaties of El Salvador
Treaties of Estonia
Treaties of Fiji
Treaties of Finland
Treaties of France
Treaties of Georgia (country)
Treaties of Germany
Treaties of Greece
Treaties of Guatemala
Treaties of Guyana
Treaties of Honduras
Treaties of Hungary
Treaties of Iceland
Treaties of Israel
Treaties of Italy
Treaties of Kazakhstan
Treaties of Kenya
Treaties of Latvia
Treaties of Liechtenstein
Treaties of Lithuania
Treaties of North Macedonia
Treaties of Mexico
Treaties of Moldova
Treaties of Monaco
Treaties of Nauru
Treaties of the Netherlands
Treaties of New Zealand
Treaties of Nicaragua
Treaties of Norway
Treaties of the State of Palestine
Treaties of Panama
Treaties of Paraguay
Treaties of the Philippines
Treaties of Poland
Treaties of Portugal
Treaties of San Marino
Treaties of Serbia
Treaties of Singapore
Treaties of Slovakia
Treaties of Slovenia
Treaties of South Sudan
Treaties of Spain
Treaties of Suriname
Treaties of Sweden
Treaties of Switzerland
Treaties of East Timor
Treaties of Uganda
Treaties of Ukraine
Treaties of the United Kingdom
Treaties of the United States
Treaties of Uruguay
Treaties extended to Greenland
Treaties extended to the Faroe Islands
Treaties extended to the Netherlands Antilles
Treaties extended to Aruba
Treaties extended to Anguilla
Treaties extended to Guernsey
Treaties extended to Bermuda
Treaties extended to the British Antarctic Territory
Treaties extended to the British Indian Ocean Territory
Treaties extended to the British Virgin Islands
Treaties extended to the Cayman Islands
Treaties extended to the Falkland Islands
Treaties extended to the Isle of Man
Treaties extended to Montserrat
Treaties extended to the Pitcairn Islands
Treaties extended to South Georgia and the South Sandwich Islands
Treaties extended to Saint Helena, Ascension and Tristan da Cunha
Treaties extended to the Turks and Caicos Islands
Treaties extended to Akrotiri and Dhekelia
Treaties extended to Jersey